Derevenka Kuznechikha is a rural locality (a village) in Shapshinskoye Rural Settlement, Kharovsky District, Vologda Oblast, Russia. The population was 3 as of 2002.

Geography 
Derevenka Kuznechikha is located 19 km southwest of Kharovsk (the district's administrative centre) by road. Sosnovka is the nearest rural locality.

References 

Rural localities in Kharovsky District